Pallavi Ramisetty is an Indian Actress and Model. She appears in Telugu serials . She made her first TV appearance with Rangula Kala show and mostly acts in daily serials on the ETV Channel. She rose to fame with the serials Bharyamani and Aadade Aadharam. She won a Nandi Award for Best Television actress for her appearance in Bharyamani.

Television serials

Television shows 
Ali 369
Star Mahila
Cash

Awards 

 Nandi Awards for Best Television Actress

References

External links
 

Living people
Year of birth missing (living people)
Actresses from Vijayawada
Indian television actresses
Actresses in Telugu television
Nandi Award winners
Telugu actresses